The membranous layer or stratum membranosum is the deepest layer of subcutaneous tissue. It is a fusion of fibres into a homogeneous layer below the adipose tissue, for example, superficial to muscular fascias.

It is considered a fascia by some sources, but not by others. However, prominent areas of the membranous layer are called fascias; these include the fascia of Scarpa in the abdomen and the fascia of Colles in the perineum.

References

Skin anatomy